Paul Lasenby (born 1975 in Buckinghamshire) is an English former professional mountain biker. 
Lasenby was the first person to win a national cross country title on a dual suspension mountain bike.

Major results

1996
 1st British National Points Series
1997
 1st  National XC Championships
1999
 1st  National XC Championships

References

1975 births
Living people
English male cyclists
Cross-country mountain bikers
People from Buckinghamshire